Silicon Docks is a nickname for the area in Dublin, Ireland around Grand Canal Dock, stretching to the IFSC, city centre east, and city centre south near the Grand Canal. The nickname makes reference to Silicon Valley, and was adopted because of the concentration of European headquarters of high-tech companies such as Google, Facebook, Twitter, LinkedIn, Indeed and startups in the area. The number of tech professionals working in technology firms in the area is about 7,000.

History
In the wake of the dot-com bubble collapse from 1999 to 2001, IDA Ireland's director of operations in California, Dermot Tuohy, made moves to bring the at-the-time budding tech companies, PayPal, eBay, Overture (which would later become part of Yahoo!), and Google to Dublin. In 2002, Google executives agreed to investigate the possibility of opening operations in Dublin. They viewed the Digital Hub in the city centre west, which now houses 900 people and is the location for the European headquarters of companies such as Eventbrite and Etsy. Google's property advisors at the time also alerted them to an alternative location at Grand Canal Dock, identifying the potential of a number of buildings on Barrow Street owned by developer Liam Carroll. Within walking distance from the city centre, the location was seen by the company as having the right mix of factors to attract the type of employee they wanted in Dublin. Google's California offices encouraged a college campus-style atmosphere, something achievable in the Grand Canal Dock location. The visitors decided that once the building, which was still under construction, was complete, they would rent 60,000sq ft of Gordon House on Barrow Street, which they moved into in 2004. It's a choice still seen by those in the IDA as a seismic shift for investment in Dublin. The agency, and many others including senior Google employees, feel the decision was directly responsible for many other Silicon Valley names, such as Twitter and Facebook, choosing to set up shop nearby.

Many of the new buildings around Grand Canal Dock were completed in 2007, just as the financial crisis hit Ireland. This meant that many of these high-end buildings stood empty in the period of economic uncertainty that followed. Since 2012 in the wake of Ireland's economic recovery, international investors have been buying prime office space in the area.

In November 2013, a new fast-track planning scheme was approved by Dublin City Council to allow for docklands buildings of up to 22 floors in height – 50% higher than Dublin's tallest building. The Docklands Strategic Development Zone (SDZ) Planning Scheme gives council planners the power to make decisions that cannot be appealed to An Bord Pleanála, ensuring a minimum of delay for developers. The SDZ represents the first major planning initiative since the 2012 decision to wind up the Docklands Authority, but to retain an appropriate fast track planning framework to complete the Docklands project. Dublin City Council, which is taking over the Docklands Authority's powers, is determined to encourage the continued development of the 66 hectares, north and south of the river, that comprise the new planning zone. The plan identifies five specific development hubs: Spencer Dock, Point Village, Grand Canal Dock, Britain Quay and Boland's Mill. One-third of the overall docklands area – 22 hectares – is ready to be developed. Buildings left uncompleted since the financial crisis are now progressively being completed. Most notably, the former Anglo Irish Bank building, the unfinished skeleton of which was an icon of the financial crisis, was finished in 2017 by its new owner, the Central Bank of Ireland.It should also be noted that due to the housing crisis in Dublin, and the marked increase in the cost of living, there is now pressure on tech firms to retain staff in the Silicon Docks area.  Many of whom are looking elsewhere in Ireland to establish offices where the cost of living is more affordable.

Etymology
The name Silicon Docks first appeared in 2011 as the area made a comeback amidst economic recovery after the projects were left unfinished during the financial crisis of 2007–2008. Since then, the term appeared in several articles by various media sources as well as Google Dublin's homepage. A book titled Silicon Docks: The Rise of Dublin as a Global Tech Hub by Pamela Newenham was released 22 January 2015, published by Ireland's Liberties Press.
Other nicknames for the area include the Google Basin.

Development
While it has been reported that the reasons behind the development of Silicon Docks are 'scarce' or 'challenging', three areas are generally focused on, including corporate tax incentive, human capital, and seed funding.

Corporate tax incentive
Ireland's low corporate tax rate—just 12.5%--has long attracted entrepreneurs and was once the country's key selling point for foreign business owners. However, the tax implications that companies face in major deals have been described as an "impediment". The headline rate of Capital Gains Tax ('CGT') was 33% as of August 2019.

Human capital
Ireland boasts the youngest population in all of Europe. In 2012, Citibank's annual list of most competitive cities in the world ranked Dublin as the city with the best "human capital." The city is home to dozens of colleges and universities, including Dublin City University, Trinity College Dublin, University College Dublin, and Technological University Dublin.

The local talent pool has received a boost from Google, which opened its Dublin headquarters in 2002 and has since been recruiting highly trained tech talent from all around the world, thanks to Ireland's lenient work visa process. As of 2015, Google employs some 3,500 people in Dublin. Facebook, LinkedIn, Fleetmatics and Twitter, among others, employ hundreds more.

Seed funding

The Competitive Start Fund of Enterprise Ireland invests in 15 seed-stage start-ups every quarter. There are also other accelerators in the city offering start-ups much-needed seed funding, including Launchpad. However, Prof Vinny Cahill, Dean of Research and computer science lecturer at Trinity College Dublin, explained in 2012, "There is definitely a growing venture capital community here. But if you look at Silicon Valley, there's a network of people who have been through the business and who encourage investment. It's starting to evolve in Dublin, but we're not at Silicon Valley's level yet."

Tech companies located in Silicon Docks
The following is a list of just some of the tech companies located in the Silicon Docks area, divided into geographical areas.

Grand Canal Dock/Grand Canal Square
Google
Facebook
Accenture
Airbnb
TripAdvisor
Indeed
Squarespace
Pinterest
Tenable
Salesforce
Zalando

City centre east/IFSC
Arista Networks
Twitter
HubSpot
Dogpatch Labs 

City centre south/Grand Canal
Jet.com (closed)
Amazon.com
LinkedIn
Dropbox
SurveyMonkey
Groupon
Yelp 
Nitro 
Wrike 
Zendesk
Asana
MongoDB
Stripe
ActiveCampaign

City centre/Northside Dublin
 Etsy

Dublin south/Dún Laoghaire–Rathdown
 Microsoft

Dublin north/Blanchardstown
 PayPal

Dublin South/ Citywest 
 SAP

See also
Silicon Alley
Silicon Roundabout
Silicon Wadi
Silicon Fen
Silicon Glen
Dublin Docklands
Dublin Tech Summit
The Digital Hub

References

Places in Dublin (city)
Information technology places
Dublin Docklands